Desmiphora lineatipennis is a species of beetle in the family Cerambycidae. It was described by Stephan von Breuning in 1943. It is known from Argentina.

References

Desmiphora
Beetles described in 1943